John Henry Quick (June 20, 1870 – September 9, 1922) was a United States Marine who received the Medal of Honor for his actions at Guantanamo Bay, Cuba in 1898 during the Spanish–American War and the Distinguished Service Cross and the Navy Cross during World War I.

Early years
Quick was born June 20, 1870, in Charles Town, Jefferson County, West Virginia.

Military service
He enlisted in the United States Marine Corps on August 10, 1892, from Philadelphia, Pennsylvania. He received the Medal of Honor "for gallantry in action" in signalling the gunfire support vessel  while exposed to heavy enemy fire at Guantanamo Bay, Cuba on June 14, 1898.

Throughout his 26-year career as a Marine, Quick participated in every campaign the Marines were involved in during his enlistment and he was the holder of several awards for valor. The campaigns he participated in include The West Indies Campaign, The Spanish–American War, the Philippine–American War, Cuban Campaign, Battle of Vera Cruz (1914) and, World War I.

Spanish–American War

During the morning of June 14, 1898, Companies "C" and "D" of Lt. Col Robert W. Huntington's Marine Battalion and approximately fifty Cubans moved through the hills to seize Cuzco Well, the main water supply for the Spanish garrison at Guantanamo Bay, Cuba. The  moved east along the shore ready to furnish naval gunfire support upon call. The Spanish soon discovered the movement and their main body near the Well was alerted. The Marines and Cubans occupied the hill which overlooked the enemy's position, but were immediately subjected to heavy long-range rifle fire. Captain George F. Elliott (later Commandant of the Marine Corps), who had succeeded to command of the Marine Detachment, signaled the Dolphin to shell the Spanish position; but because the sender was not clearly visible, the message was misinterpreted, and the vessel began dropping shells on a small detachment of Marines who were en route to join the fight. The problem of directing the fire of the USS Dolphin was solved by Sergeant Quick who heroically placed himself in plain sight of the vessel, but in danger of falling shells as well as a brisk enemy fire, and signaled for the bombardment to be stopped. War correspondent and author Stephen Crane, who was with the Marines there, later described the scene in his war tale "Marines Signaling Under Fire at Guantanamo":

When Sergeant Quick finished this message, the ship answered. Quick then picked up his M1895 Lee Navy rifle and resumed his place on the firing line. The Dolphin shifted her fire and by 2:00 p.m. the Spaniards had begun to retreat. For his gallant and selfless conduct during this action, Quick received the Medal of Honor.

Philippine–American War
During the Philippine–American War, he served as a Gunnery Sergeant in the Samaran campaign from October 26, 1901, to March 26, 1902. He participated in a battle at the Sohoton Cliffs, where he played a decisive role laying down covering fire for the advancing Marines with an M1895 Colt–Browning machine gun, and in Waller's March across Samar under the command of Major Littleton W. T. Waller.

Veracruz

Quick served on expeditionary duty in Mexico (April 21, 1914 – November 23, 1914).

During the Veracruz Campaign of 1914, Quick was again cited for valor during the assault of that city, for which the Secretary of the Navy commendation says of his performance:

He was continually exposed to fire during the first two days of the operation and showed coolness, bravery, and judgment in the prompt manner in which he performed his duties.

World War I
Quick sailed to France as one of the Battalion Sergeants Major of the 6th Marine Regiment in 1917.

The Battle of Belleau Wood was the opening battle of the War for him and he was awarded the Distinguished Service Cross and the Navy Cross for assisting in the delivery of ammunition, over a road swept by enemy artillery and machine gun fire, to Boureches.

He earned these decorations on June 6, 1918, when "he volunteered and assisted in taking a truckload of ammunition and material into Bouresches, France, over a road swept by artillery and machine-gun fire, thereby relieving a critical situation." He was further awarded the 2d Division Citation, and his regiment was awarded the French fourragère of the croix de guerre.

In addition to Belleau Wood he participated in every battle that was fought by the Marines in France until October 16, 1918, including the Toulon Sector at Verdun, the Aisne-Marne Offensive (popularly known as the Battle of Soissons), the Marbache Sector near Pont-a-Mousoon, the St. Mihiel Offensive, the Battle of Blanc Mont Ridge, and the Meuse-Argonne Offensive Sector.

Retirement and death
He retired November 20, 1918 and after requesting to come back, was recalled from July 26, 1920 – September 15, 1920.

He died in St. Louis, Missouri on September 9, 1922, at the age of 52 and is buried in Memorial Park Cemetery in Jennings, Missouri.

Honors and awards

Military decorations
 Medal of Honor
 Distinguished Service Cross
 Navy Cross
 Silver Star Medal (Citation Star)

Medal of Honor citation
Rank and organization: Sergeant, U.S. Marine Corps. Born: June 20, 1870, Charleston, W. Virginia Accredited to: Pennsylvania. G.O. No. 5: December 4, 13, 1898. Other Navy award: Navy Cross.

Citation:

In action during the battle of Cuzco, Cuba, 14 June 1898. Distinguishing himself during this action, Quick signaled the U.S.S. Dolphin on 3 different occasions while exposed to a heavy fire from the enemy.

Navy Cross citation
Citation:
The President of the United States of America takes pleasure in presenting the Navy Cross to Sergeant Major John Henry Quick (MCSN: 68644), United States Marine Corps, for extraordinary heroism while serving with the Headquarters Company, 6th Regiment (Marines), 2d Division, A.E.F. in action at Bouresches, France, 6 June 1918. Sergeant Major Quick volunteered and assisted in taking a truck load of ammunition and material into Bouresches, France, over a road swept by artillery and machine-gun fire, thereby relieving a critical situation.

Distinguished Service Cross citation
Citation:

The President of the United States of America, authorized by Act of Congress, July 9, 1918, takes pleasure in presenting the Distinguished Service Cross to Sergeant Major John Henry Quick (MCSN: 68644), United States Marine Corps, for extraordinary heroism while serving with the Headquarters Company, Sixth Regiment (Marines), 2d Division, A.E.F., in action at Bouresches, France, 6 June 1918. Sergeant Major Quick volunteered and assisted in taking a truck load of ammunition and material into Bouresches, France, over a road swept by artillery and machine-gun fire, thereby relieving a critical situation.

Other honors
In addition to his military medals the United States Navy named a Gleaves-class destroyer  in his honor. The ship was completed and launched on May 3, 1942, and was sponsored by Quick's niece. The ship earned four battle stars for actions during World War II.  The Liberty ship SS John H. Quick was also named after him.

See also

 List of Medal of Honor recipients for the Spanish–American War

Notes

References

 
 
 
 

1870 births
1922 deaths
United States Marine Corps personnel of World War I
American military personnel of the Banana Wars
United States Marine Corps Medal of Honor recipients
Recipients of the Navy Cross (United States)
American military personnel of the Philippine–American War
American military personnel of the Spanish–American War
United States Marines
Recipients of the Distinguished Service Cross (United States)
People from Charles Town, West Virginia
Military personnel from West Virginia
Spanish–American War recipients of the Medal of Honor